Perry Township is the name of fourteen townships in Indiana:

 Perry Township, Allen County, Indiana
 Perry Township, Boone County, Indiana
 Perry Township, Clay County, Indiana
 Perry Township, Clinton County, Indiana
 Perry Township, Delaware County, Indiana
 Perry Township, Lawrence County, Indiana
 Perry Township, Marion County, Indiana
 Perry Township, Martin County, Indiana
 Perry Township, Miami County, Indiana
 Perry Township, Monroe County, Indiana
 Perry Township, Noble County, Indiana
 Perry Township, Tippecanoe County, Indiana
 Perry Township, Vanderburgh County, Indiana
 Perry Township, Wayne County, Indiana

See also
Perry Township (disambiguation)

Indiana township disambiguation pages